David Olaoye (born 18 October 1996) is an English professional footballer who plays as a forward for Jiskra Domažlice.

Career
Olaoye spent his youth career with Junior Hammers and Elite Pro Sports. He began his senior career with English non-league sides Barking, Newham, Tottenham Phoenix and Ware. In 2016, he joined Greek regional side AO Tympakiou; amid interest from Sheffield United. After twelve total appearances and two goals in Greece, Olaoye departed to subsequently join NK Bravo of Slovenia in January 2017. His stay lasted a further six months, but four of those were spent off-field due to a notable ligament injury. In August 2017, Primera C Metropolitana side El Porvenir signed Olaoye; signing a two-year contract.

He made his debut on 20 November versus Berazategui, becoming the first English professional to play in Argentine football. He left El Porvenir in June 2018, subsequently having a trial with UAI Urquiza. The trial came to an end due injury to his rib cage which occurred in training, which left him sidelined for over a month.  In 2019, Olaoye switched Argentina for Norway after agreeing terms with Nybergsund of the 3. divisjon. He scored on his second appearance against Verdal, though received a red card later in the match. Olaoye moved across the division to join Årdal for 2020. He didn't appear competitively for them, due to the COVID-19 pandemic, and departed midway through the year to sign for Jiskra Domažlice in the Czech Republic.

Olaoye initially featured for Jiskra Domažlice's B team in the fifth tier, scoring twice on his debut versus Baník Stříbro on 12 September. His first appearance for their senior side came on 19 September against Admira Prague, as he was substituted on for the final minutes of a 4–2 win in the Bohemian Football League.

Personal life
Olaoye grew up in Forest Gate, London with Nigerian parents. He supports Arsenal. Two of his three brothers, Daniel & Jonathan, are also footballers.

Career statistics
.

References

External links
David Olaoye on BDFA

1996 births
Living people
Footballers from Greater London
English people of Nigerian descent
English footballers
English expatriate footballers
Expatriate footballers in Greece
Expatriate footballers in Slovenia
Expatriate footballers in Argentina
Expatriate footballers in Norway
Expatriate footballers in the Czech Republic
English expatriate sportspeople in Greece
English expatriate sportspeople in Slovenia
English expatriate sportspeople in Argentina
English expatriate sportspeople in Norway
English expatriate sportspeople in the Czech Republic
Black British sportsmen
Association football forwards
Primera C Metropolitana players
Norwegian Third Division players
Bohemian Football League players
Barking F.C. players
London APSA F.C. players
Ware F.C. players
El Porvenir footballers
Nybergsund IL players
Årdal FK players
TJ Jiskra Domažlice players
FC Viktoria Otrokovice players